Lamington is a conservation village in South Lanarkshire in Scotland, roughly between Biggar and Lanark and sits astride the A702 trunk road.

It is reputed to be the home of Marion Braidfute, legendary wife of William Wallace.

It has also been claimed that the village gave its name to the Lamington sponge cake popular in Australia.

Popular Culture
Lamington features in The Scottish Chiefs.

See also
Baron Lamington

References

External links
article on the village

Villages in South Lanarkshire